Robert Schrijber (born 3 March 1965) is a Dutch former mixed martial artist and kickboxer. He currently runs his own MMA and Muay Thai team in Krommenie, Netherlands called Sports Academy Schreiber. His most famous students at the moment are UFC fighter Stefan Struve, and professional wrestler Tom Budgen.

Background
Schrijber was born in Alkmaar, Netherlands. His parents divorced when he was young, which separated Schrijber and his brother Fred, who had a close relationship. Schrijber had a troubled childhood and began abusing drugs and alcohol from a young age. He also had an interest in punk rock music, starting a band with his brother, and got a job melting copper in a factory. Around this time, the young Schrijber began practicing Judo and Karate at a local gym.

Fighting career
Schrijber started his martial arts career in 1981, when he started training in karate and judo in Haarlem, Netherlands. A year later he started training Muay Thai at the same gym. After his transition to the acclaimed Mejiro Gym, he started training with seven time muay thai world champion Rob Kaman. At this gym Schrijber became the Dutch and WKA European muay thai champion. In his shot at the WKA World title against Zijo Poljo, Schreiber crushed his left ankle in the third round. Although he did finish the fight, he lost a jury decision.

In 1995 he started his MMA career. He fought notable opponents like Heath Herring, Wanderlei Silva, Semmy Schilt and Igor Vovchanchyn and made three appearances in Pride FC. His last appearance as an MMA fighter was in 2008 against Barrington Patterson, which he lost due to a unanimous decision.

Personal life
After retirement Bob works as coach. He also acts in films

Championships and Accomplishments
International Mix-Fight Association
IMA KO Power Tournament Winner
M-1 Global
1997 M-1 MFC World Championship Tournament Winner
World Vale Tudo Championship
WVC 9 Tournament Runner Up

Mixed martial arts record

|-
| Loss
| align=center| 20–17–1
| Barrington Patterson
| Decision (unanimous)
| KOE: Tough Is Not Enough
| 
| align=center| 2
| align=center| 5:00
| Rotterdam, Netherlands
| Fight was for W.I.P.U. "King of the Ring" veterans title +103 kg.
|-
| Loss
| align=center| 20–16–1
| Melvin Manhoef
| Decision (unanimous)
| It's Showtime Boxing & MMA Event 2005 Amsterdam
| 
| align=center| 2
| align=center| 5:00
| Amsterdam, Netherlands
| 
|-
| Loss
| align=center| 20–15–1
| Roman Zentsov
| Submission (rear-naked choke)
| M-1 MFC - Russia vs. the World 6
| 
| align=center| 1
| align=center| 2:12
| Moscow, Russia
| 
|-
| Loss
| align=center| 20–14–1
| Igor Vovchanchyn
| Submission (rear-naked choke)
| It's Showtime 2003 Amsterdam
| 
| align=center| 2
| align=center| 4:05
| Amsterdam, Netherlands
| 
|-
| Win
| align=center| 20–13–1
| Melvin Manhoef
| KO (punches)
| 2H2H 6: Simply the Best 6
| 
| align=center| 1
| align=center| 4:01
| Rotterdam, Netherlands
| 
|-
| Loss
| align=center| 19–13–1
| Cyrille Diabaté
| Decision
| 2H2H 5: Simply the Best 5
| 
| align=center| 2
| align=center| 3:00
| Rotterdam, Netherlands
| 
|-
| Loss
| align=center| 19–12–1
| Sokun Koh
| Decision (split)
| Pride The Best Vol.2
| 
| align=center| 2
| align=center| 5:00
| Tokyo, Japan
| 
|-
| Loss
| align=center| 19–11–1
| Gilbert Yvel
| TKO (doctor stoppage)
| 2H2H 4: Simply the Best 4
| 
| align=center| N/A
| align=center| N/A
| Rotterdam, Netherlands
| 
|-
| Win
| align=center| 19–10–1
| Martin Malkhasyan
| TKO (punches)
| M-1 MFC - Russia vs. the World 2
| 
| align=center| 1
| align=center| 8:40
| Saint Petersburg, Russia
| 
|-
| Win
| align=center| 18–10–1
| Martin Malkhasyan
| KO 
| 2H2H 3: Hotter Than Hot
| 
| align=center| N/A
| align=center| 6:48
| Rotterdam, Netherlands
| 
|-
| Draw
| align=center| 17–10–1
| Bobby Hoffman
| Draw
| Rings Holland: No Guts, No Glory
| 
| align=center| 2
| align=center| 5:00
| Amsterdam, Netherlands
| 
|-
| Loss
| align=center| 17–10
| Gary Goodridge
| Submission (kneebar)
| 2H2H 2: Simply The Best
| 
| align=center| 1
| align=center| 2:32
| Rotterdam, Netherlands
| 
|-
| Win
| align=center| 17–9
| Ian Freeman
| TKO (doctor stoppage)
| It's Showtime - Christmas Edition
| 
| align=center| 1
| align=center| 1:28
| Haarlem, Netherlands
| 
|-
| Loss
| align=center| 16–9
| Semmy Schilt
| Technical Submission (guillotine choke)
| It's Showtime - Exclusive
| 
| align=center| 2
| align=center| 1:00
| Haarlem, Netherlands
| 
|-
| Win
| align=center| 16–8
| Peter Varga
| KO 
| Battle of Arnhem 2
| 
| align=center| N/A
| align=center| N/A
| Arnhem, Netherlands
| 
|-
| Win
| align=center| 15–8
| Hugo Duarte
| TKO (punches)
| 2H2H 1: 2 Hot 2 Handle
| 
| align=center| 1
| align=center| 3:34
| Rotterdam, Netherlands
| 
|-
| Loss
| align=center| 14–8
| Wanderlei Silva
| Submission (rear-naked choke)
| Pride Grand Prix 2000 Opening Round
| 
| align=center| 1
| align=center| 2:42
| Tokyo, Japan
| 2000 PRIDE Openweight Grand Prix Alternate Bout. 
|-
| Win
| align=center| 14–7
| Moti Horenstein
| TKO (submission to punches)
| Amsterdam Absolute Championship 2
| 
| align=center| 1
| align=center| 3:04
| Amsterdam, Netherlands
| 
|-
| Win
| align=center| 13–7
| Jerrel Venetiaan
| KO (punch)
| It's Showtime - It's Showtime
| 
| align=center| 1
| align=center| 3:42
| Haarlem, Netherlands
| 
|-
| Loss
| align=center| 12–7
| Heath Herring
| TKO (punches)
| World Vale Tudo Championship 9
| 
| align=center| 1
| align=center| 2:19
| Oranjestad, Aruba
| WVC 9 Tournament Finals.
|-
| Loss
| align=center| 12–6
| Alexandre Ferreira
| Submission (rear-naked choke)
| World Vale Tudo Championship 9
| 
| align=center| 1
| align=center| 2:11
| Oranjestad, Aruba
| WVC 9 Tournament Semifinals.
|-
| Win
| align=center| 12–5
| Josh Sursa
| TKO (submission to elbows)
| World Vale Tudo Championship 9
| 
| align=center| 1
| align=center| 0:57
| Oranjestad, Aruba
| WVC 9 Tournament Quarterfinals.
|-
| Loss
| align=center| 11–5
| Daijiro Matsui
| DQ (illegal axe-kick after the bell)
| Pride 7
| 
| align=center| 1
| align=center| 10:00
| Yokohama, Japan
| Schreiber delivered an axe-kick after the bell to the back of Matsui's head while Matsui was on all fours.
|-
| Win
| align=center| 11–4
| Toon Stelling
| TKO 
| Battle of Arnhem 1
| 
| align=center| N/A
| align=center| N/A
| Arnhem, Netherlands
| 
|-
| Win
| align=center| 10–4
| Big Mo T
| KO 
| FFH: Free Fight Gala
| 
| align=center| N/A
| align=center| N/A
| Beverwijk, Netherlands
| 
|-
| Win
| align=center| 9–4
| Moti Horenstein
| KO 
| Amsterdam Absolute Championship 1
| 
| align=center| N/A
| align=center| N/A
| Amsterdam, Netherlands
| 
|-
| Loss
| align=center| 8–4
| Mikhail Avetisyan
| Submission (rear-naked choke)
| IAFC: Pankration European Championship 1998
| 
| align=center| 1
| align=center| 12:04
| Moscow, Russia
| 
|-
| Win
| align=center| 8–3
| Iouri Bekichev
| TKO 
| Rings Russia: Russia vs. Holland
| 
| align=center| 1
| align=center| 3:01
| Yekaterinburg, Russia
| 
|-
| Win
| align=center| 7–3
| Gilbert Yvel
| KO 
| IMA: KO Power Tournament
| 
| align=center| 1
| align=center| 4:15
| Amsterdam, Netherlands
| Won IMA: KO Power Tournament
|-
| Win
| align=center| 6–3
| Glen Brown
| TKO 
| IMA: KO Power Tournament
| 
| align=center| 1
| align=center| 3:26
| Amsterdam, Netherlands
| IMA: KO Power Tournament Semifinals.
|-
| Loss
| align=center| 5–3
| Gilbert Yvel
| Submission (achilles lock)
| Rings Holland: The King of Rings
| 
| align=center| 2
| align=center| 1:12
| Amsterdam, Netherlands
| 
|-
| Win
| align=center| 5–2
| Ruslan Kerselyan
| KO (kick)
| M-1 MFC - World Championship 1997
| 
| align=center| 1
| align=center| 2:53
| Saint Petersburg, Russia
| Won 1997 M-1 Global World Championship Tournament.
|-
| Win
| align=center| 4–2
| Emil Stroka
| TKO (submission to strikes)
| M-1 MFC - World Championship 1997
| 
| align=center| 1
| align=center| 0:54
| Saint Petersburg, Russia
| 1997 M-1 Global World Championship Tournament Semifinals.
|-
| Win
| align=center| 3–2
| Toon Stelling
| TKO (punches)
| Rings Holland - The Final Challenge
| 
| align=center| 1
| align=center| 6:01
| Amsterdam, Netherlands
| 
|-
| Win
| align=center| 2–2
| Emil Kristev
| Submission (guillotine choke)
| Rings Holland - Kings of Martial Arts
| 
| align=center| 1
| align=center| 4:09
| Amsterdam, Netherlands
| 
|-
| Win
| align=center| 1–2
| Aruzini Lusinoff
| KO 
| Rings - Budokan Hall 1995
| 
| align=center| N/A
| align=center| N/A
| Tokyo, Japan
| 
|-
| Loss
| align=center| 0–2
| Ed de Kruijf
| Submission (forearm choke)
| Cage Fight Tournament 1
| 
| align=center| 1
| align=center| 4:20
| Antwerp, Belgium
| 
|-
| Loss
| align=center| 0–1
| Rudi de Loos
| Submission (rear-naked choke)
| CFT 1: Cage Fight Tournament 1
| 
| align=center| 1
| align=center| 2:26
| Antwerp, Belgium
|

Kickboxing record (incomplete)

|-  bgcolor="#FFBBBB"
| 1999-03-27 || Loss||align=left| Lloyd van Dams  || Amsterdam Fight Night 1999 || Amsterdam, Netherlands|| Decision (Unanimous) || 5 || 3:00 || 6-5
|-  bgcolor="#FFBBBB"
| 1998-05-31 || Loss||align=left| Lloyd van Dams  ||Fight Of The Decade 1998 || Amsterdam, Netherlands|| TKO (Corner stoppage) || 4 || 3:00 || 6-4
|-  bgcolor="#CCFFCC"
| 1995-07-18 || Win||align=left| Kenneth Felter ||Rings Japan || Osaka, Japan||Decision || 5 || 3:00 || 6-3
|-  bgcolor="#CCFFCC"
| 1995-01-25 || Win||align=left| Aldinov Roussimov ||Rings Japan || Tokyo, Japan||TKO || 2 || 2:46 || 6-3
|-  bgcolor="#FFBBBB"
| 1994-05-08 || Loss||align=left| Ernesto Hoost || K-1: K-2 Grand Prix '94 || Amsterdam, Netherlands|| TKO || 1 || 3:00 || 5-3
|-  bgcolor="#CCFFCC"
| 1994-05-08 || Win||align=left| Artem Tonoyan || K-1: K-2 Grand Prix '94 || Amsterdam, Netherlands|| - || 5 || 3:00 || 5-2
|-  bgcolor="#CCFFCC"
| 1994-05-08 || Win||align=left| Zijo Poljo || K-1: K-2 Grand Prix '94 || Amsterdam, Netherlands|| - || 5 || 3:00 || 4-2
|-  bgcolor="#FFBBBB"
|  1994-03-06 || Loss ||align=left| Stan Longinidis  || Taipan 1: The Best Of The Best 1994 || Australia || Decision (unanimous) || 5 || 3:00 ||3-2
|-  bgcolor="#CCFFCC"
| 1994-01-22 || Win||align=left| Lee Hasdell || WKA: Moscow Fight Night 1994 || Moscow, Russia|| Tko (Low kicks) || 5 || - || 3-1
|-  bgcolor="#CCFFCC"
| 1993-12-25 || Win||align=left| Kazuyuki Mori || Rings Japan || Tokyo, Japan|| Tko (Body Kick) || 2 || 0:47 || 2-1
|-  bgcolor="#FFBBBB"
|  1993-08-06 || Loss ||align=left| Jan Lomulder  ||  Rings Japan || Tokyo, Japan || Decision || 5 || 3:00 ||1-1
|-  bgcolor="#CCFFCC"
| 1993-06-09 || Win||align=left| Toshiyuki Atokawa || Rings Japan || Tokyo, Japan|| - || 5 || 3:00 || 1-0

Notes

External links 

1965 births
Living people
Dutch male kickboxers
Heavyweight kickboxers
Dutch male mixed martial artists
Heavyweight mixed martial artists
Mixed martial artists utilizing Muay Thai
Mixed martial artists utilizing karate
Mixed martial artists utilizing judo
Dutch Muay Thai practitioners
Dutch male karateka
Dutch male judoka
Sportspeople from Alkmaar
20th-century Dutch people
21st-century Dutch people